Sasthram Jayichu Manushyan Thottu is a 1973 Indian Malayalam-language film directed by A. B. Raj and produced by T. E. Vasudevan. The film stars Prem Nazir, Jayabharathi, Adoor Bhasi and Thikkurissy Sukumaran Nair. The film had musical score by V. Dakshinamoorthy.

Cast 

Prem Nazir as Prakash
Jayabharathi as Sulochana
Adoor Bhasi as Ramakrishnan
Thikkurissy Sukumaran Nair as Doctor
Sankaradi as Kurup
T. R. Omana as Prakash's Mother
Raghavan as Venugopalan
Paravoor Bharathan as Sulochana's Father
 Paul Vengola as Gopalan
Radhadevi
Santha Devi as Sulochana's Mother
Ushakumari as Suvarna

Soundtrack

References

External links 
 

1973 films
1970s Malayalam-language films